Grimston is a hamlet in the East Riding of Yorkshire, England, in an area known as Holderness.

Grimston lies east of the B1242 road near to the North Sea coast and forms part of the civil parish of East Garton.

To the north of the hamlet, on the coast, is an ancient moated site, dating from the 12th to 14th centuries, formerly the site of a fortified medieval manor house. It was seat of the Grimston family until a fire in the mid-17th century.

The family then built a new manor house at Grimston Garth in 18th-century Gothic style. Grimston Garth lies south of the hamlet on a private road. The stable block at Grimston Garth was designated a Grade II* listed building in 1966 and is now recorded in the National Heritage List for England, maintained by Historic England.

References

External links

Villages in the East Riding of Yorkshire
Holderness
Populated coastal places in the East Riding of Yorkshire